Jesús Garay (born 1949) is a Spanish film director and screenwriter. His 1993 film The Window Over the Way was entered into the 44th Berlin International Film Festival.

Selected filmography
 Manderley (1981)
 The Window Over the Way (1993)
 Eloïse's Lover (2009)

References

External links

1949 births
Living people
Spanish film directors
Spanish male screenwriters